Theophilus Dicaeus was a minor Indo-Greek king who ruled for a short time in the Paropamisadae. He was possibly a relative of Zoilus I and is only known from coins. It is possible that some of Theophilus' coins in fact belong to another ruler, in Greek Bactria, during approximately the same period.

Time of reign
While Bopearachchi suggests c. 90 BCE, R. C. Senior believes that Theophilus ruled in the 130s BCE. Both numismatics do however suggest that the reigns of Theophilus and Nicias were adjacent.

Coins of Theophilos
Just like Zoilus I, Theophilus struck Indian silver coins with Heracles, a common symbol of the house of Euthydemus I, and the epithet Dikaios/Dhramikasa "The Just/Follower of the Dharma". The monograms are mostly the same as those of Nicias. The bronzes have similar inscriptions.

Bronzes of Theophilos:

A Bactrian king Theophilus?
There is a wholly different, and very rare, Attic-weight coinage of a king Theophilus. Found in Bactria, these coins feature a reverse with a seated Athena with Nike, a different title Autokrator "Autocrat King", and also a separate monogram. Although this is not a very common occurrence on Indo-Greek coins, the coins of Theophilus have generally been accepted as belonging to one unique king. Bopearachchi has supported this proposition by pointing at the similarity between the portraits and the identical treatment of the diadem (one end straight, one end crooked).

Against this, Jakobsson argues that the coins issued by the later Indo-Greek kings  for export into Bactria were consistently similar to these kings' regular Indian coinage. Consequently, the coins of Theophilos Autokrator were not such export issues, but should belong to a Bactrian ruler. Jakobsson suggests that Theophilus Autocrator was a Bactrian princelet who briefly maintained himself in some part of Bactria, after the Hellenistic kingdom there had been vanquished by nomads, presumably in the 120s BCE.

See also
 Greco-Bactrian Kingdom
 Greco-Buddhism
 Indo-Scythians
 Indo-Parthian Kingdom
 Kushan Empire

Notes

References
 The Greeks in Bactria and India, W.W. Tarn, Cambridge University Press.

Indo-Greek kings
1st-century BC rulers in Asia